Kuksina Hill is the highest top of Vaaksaare upland, the eastern part of Haanja upland, with a height of 212 m over sea level. Kuksina Hill is the highest top of Meremäe rural municipality.

Vaaksaare uplands is a moraine hillock, where agricultural patches alternate with forests and meadows. Kuksina Hill is situated in Kuksina village and is covered by forest. As a tourist object, the highest hill of Meremäe rural municipality is not as important, as Meremäe Hill in the same uplands has a viewing tower near the top. North from the Vaaksaare uplands is fertile loam plain, predominantly arable that reaches up to the Piusa River Valley.

References

Setomaa Parish
Hills of Estonia